Venkateshwara Open University (VOU) is a state private University located in Naharlagun, Arunachal Pradesh, India. It was established by the Venkateshwara Open University Act No.10 of 2012 of the Government of Arunachal Pradesh in 2012. VOU is empowered to award degrees by the University Grants Commission (UGC).

Venkateshwara Open University is established through Arunachal Pradesh State Legislative Act, LAW/LEGN-10/2012.

The university offers undergraduate, postgraduate, and diploma courses in various fields such as arts, science, commerce, management, law, education, engineering, and technology. It also offers research programs leading to the award of Ph.D. degrees.

Schools
The university is organized in 5 schools:
School of Management
School of Computer & Information Communication Technology
School of Humanities & Social Science
School of Library & Information Sciences
School of Education

References

External links
 Venkateshwara Open University

Private universities in India

Universities in Arunachal Pradesh
Itanagar
Educational institutions established in 2012
2012 establishments in Arunachal Pradesh